Ben-Porat is a surname. It may refer to:

Miriam Ben-Porat (1918–2012), Israeli jurist
Mordechai Ben-Porat (born 1923), Israeli politician
Pinchas Ben-Porat (1914–1955), Israeli aviator
Yoram Ben-Porat (born 1992), Israeli economist and president of the Hebrew University of Jerusalem
Ziva Ben-Porat, Israeli literary theorist

Jewish surnames